Jan van Deinsen (born 19 June 1953 in Tiel, Gelderland) is a retired football midfielder and forward from the Netherlands.

Playing career

Club
The left-sided midfielder from Wamel made his professional debut for NEC on 12 September 1971 against SC Telstar and also played for Go Ahead Eagles, before joining Dutch giants Feyenoord for whom he would play 7 years. He won the 1979–80 KNVB Cup with the club, but he had to quit football in 1984 due to injuries of his achilles tendon.

International
He obtained one cap for the Dutch national team, when the Netherlands lost to the Republic of Ireland on 10 September 1980 in Dublin.

Managerial career
After retiring as a player, van Deinsen coached amateur sides Babberich and JVC Cuijk and was assistant at several professional clubs as well as to fellow Dutch managers Clemens Westerhof at Nigeria and Wim Rijsbergen at Trinidad and Tobago. In 2003 he was named manager of Eerste Divisie club MVV, only to leave them in February 2004.

He was appointed manager of Achilles '29 in July 2012 after leaving the amateurs of JVC Cuijk.

Honours

Club
Feyenoord
 KNVB Cup (1) : 1979–80

References

External links
 
  Profile

1953 births
Living people
People from Tiel
People from West Maas en Waal
Association football midfielders
Dutch footballers
Netherlands international footballers
NEC Nijmegen players
Go Ahead Eagles players
Feyenoord players
Eredivisie players
Dutch football managers
MVV Maastricht managers
Achilles '29 managers
Footballers from Gelderland
Dutch expatriate sportspeople in Trinidad and Tobago
Dutch expatriate sportspeople in Nigeria
Association football coaches